The 1999 Bosch Spark Plug Grand Prix was the fourth round of the 1999 CART FedEx Champ Car World Series season, held on May 2, 1999, on the Nazareth Speedway in Nazareth, Pennsylvania.

Report

Race 
Juan Pablo Montoya followed up on his win in Long Beach by taking his first CART pole in Nazareth, beating Hélio Castro-Neves by the minute margin of one-thousandth of a second. Montoya led the early stages of the race until Castro-Neves passed him in traffic on lap 39, however, a quicker pitstop by Montoya's Ganassi team got Montoya back out in front again. Montoya led for the next 95 laps, but Castro-Neves stayed on his tail all the time, the duo being much quicker than anyone else. Castro-Neves again passed Montoya on lap 145, only for the pit stops to reverse the order. On the resulting restart, Castro-Neves was caught out and passed by P. J. Jones, and later while trying to get the place back, he spun and lost two laps, before eventually crashing out. Montoya cruised to victory ahead of Jones and Paul Tracy, which also gave him the championship lead.

Classification

Race

Caution flags

Lap Leaders

Point standings after race

References 

1999 in CART
1999 in American motorsport
Bosch Spark